Stiller may refer to:

Stiller (surname), includes a list of people with the surname Stiller
Stiller, original name of rock band Sportfreunde Stiller
Stiller, German name of novel I'm Not Stiller

See also